The 2016–17 season was Burton Albion's 67th season in their history and first ever in the Championship after gaining promotion the previous season. Along with competing in the Championship, the club also participated in the FA Cup and EFL Cup. The club finished 20th in the league table, was knocked out the third round of the FA Cup and knocked out of the second round of the EFL Cup. The season covered the period from 1 July 2016 to 30 June 2017.

Statistics

|-
|colspan=14|Player(s) out on loan:

|-
|colspan=14|Player(s) who left the club:

|}

Goals record

Disciplinary Record

Transfers

In

Out

Loans in

Loans out

Competitions

Pre-season friendlies

Championship

League table

Matches

FA Cup

EFL Cup

References

Burton Albion F.C. seasons
Burton Albion